Wagenseil is a surname that may refer to:

  (1756–1839), German writer
 Georg Christoph Wagenseil (1715–1777), 18th-century Austrian composer
 Johann Christoph Wagenseil (1633–1705), 17th-18th century German Christian scholar of Hebrew
 Kurt Wagenseil (1904–1988), German translator

German-language surnames
Occupational surnames